The U.S. National Whitewater Center (USNWC) is a not-for-profit outdoor recreation and athletic training facility for whitewater rafting, kayaking, canoeing, rock climbing, mountain biking hiking and ice skating which opened to the public on 2006.

  The Center's primary feature is the world's largest and most complex recirculating artificial whitewater river.  The river channels were designed by three-time Olympian Scott Shipley.

Whitewater channels 

The Center's recirculating river is filled with 12 million gallons of water, which is cleaned every 24 hours by a filtration and ultraviolet system. The rapids are Class II to IV and can be navigated via canoe, kayak or a guided raft. The different channels are linked by an Upper and Lower Pool which are connected via a moving-belt boat-lift conveyor.

The facility is equipped with a total of seven, 620 hp submersible pumps manufactured by Flygt. Each channel is watered by three of the pumps.  Six pumps will water both channels simultaneously.  The electricity cost of each pump is about US$45 per hour.  When only one channel is used, a low pressure, air bag actuated, Obermyer Gate separates the top of either the Wilderness or Competition Channel from the upper pond thus preventing water from entering.  Since both channels have the same drop, the extra length of the Wilderness Channel gives it a gentler slope.

Most of the water diverters are natural boulders cemented in place, but there is some use of moveable plastic bollards attached to the bottom. There are five barn door diverters hinged to the channel sides and positioned by hydraulic pistons, two above the M-Wave on the long channel, and three in the slalom competition channel. The M-Wave is designed to replicate the famous M-Wave in an irrigation channel near Montrose, Colorado.

The Wilderness Channel has six named drops, Entrance Exam (class 2), Huey Lewis (class 2), Bread and Butter (class 2+), Sunset (class 3), and M-Wave (class 3+). The Competition Channel has two named drops, Bridge Drop (class 3), and Big Drop (class 4). Commonly kayak surfed waves on the Wilderness Channel include Entrance Exam, Connor's Hole, Dave's Dilemma, Bread and Butter, Freestyle Wave, Well Hole, Sunset, Snake Lips, M-Wave, Shut Down, and Biscuits and Gravy. Commonly kayak surfed waves on the Competition Channel include Cheese Grater, Sketch Wave, Bridge Drop, and Big Drop.

Activities 
Water Sports
Whitewater Rafting – Rafters with trained raft guides can paddle Class II, III, and IV rapids on the artificial whitewater channels. In 2010, the USNWC had 100,000 rafters.
Whitewater Kayaking – Whitewater kayakers, from beginner to expert, can paddle, with or without instructors, alongside Olympic contenders.  Periodic slalom races are scheduled for all ages and all skill levels.
Flatwater Kayaking – Flatwater kayaking is offered on the Catawba River, which is adjacent to the USNWC's property.
Stand-Up Paddle Boarding – Stand-Up Paddle Boarding is new to the USNWC in 2011.  Participants stand on a board similar to a surf board and use a long paddle to maneuver along the Catawba River.

Land Sports
Ice Skating – Since 2019, the USNWC has hosted one of the largest outdoor ice rinks on the east coast. Located in the Upper Pond of the Whitewater Center, the skating environment features three distinct programming areas and an on-ice Airstream serving hot and cold beverages with seating area.
Bikers can bring their own bikes and helmets or rent equipment from the USNWC.
The trails are used for various races including the Whitewater Race Series and the XTERRA Whitewater Trail Race and Triathlon. Bikers are asked to observe the "Rules of the Trail" as established by the International Mountain Bicycling Association. 
Rock Climbing – The USNWC's climbing center is one of the largest outdoor climbing centers in the world.

Aerial Sports
Canyon Crossing – The Canyon Crossing opened as a new activity in spring 2011. At the last platform is a  zip-line which returns participants back across the gorge.
Canopy Tour – The Canopy Tour, which opened in 2011 and goes along with the recent demand for ecotourism, consists of 14 tree platforms linked by seven zip-lines, multiple sky bridges, and other aerial challenges. Guests are accompanied by two trained guides who provide educational information about the region of participants as they go from tree platform to tree platform.

Gallery

References

External links 

 

Sports venues in North Carolina
Landmarks in North Carolina
Sports venues in Charlotte, North Carolina
Artificial whitewater courses
Canoeing and kayaking venues in the United States
Sports venues completed in 2006
2006 establishments in North Carolina